The Holy Name of Jesus Cathedral is a religious building that serves as a cathedral of the Roman Catholic Church and is located in the town of Fianarantsoa, in the highlands of African and island country of Madagascar. It is located specifically in the Rue du Rova (Rova Street), in the old town, and is the seat of the Archdiocese of Fianarantsoa (Latin: Archidioecesis Fianarantsoaensis).

Follow the Latin Roman Rite and its metropolitan archbishop is Fulgence Rabemahafaly.

See also
Roman Catholicism in Madagascar

References

Roman Catholic cathedrals in Madagascar
Buildings and structures in Fianarantsoa
1871 establishments in Africa
Roman Catholic churches completed in 1890
19th-century Roman Catholic church buildings in Madagascar